Trances/Drones (1994) is an album by the American ambient musician Robert Rich. It is a two-disc compilation of Rich's drone music albums Trances (1983) and Drones (1983) plus other material that was recorded during that time.

Overview
Disc one contains the album Trances, plus the title track from Rich's 1982 debut Sunyata. At the time this compilation was released, Sunyata was only available in its original 86-minute cassette release and had been out of print for several years. When the album Sunyata was re-released in 2000 on compact disc, this title track was omitted because of the CD's 81-minute length restriction.

Disc two contains the album Drones, plus a previously unreleased track titled “Resonance,” which was recorded at Stanford University on January 31, 1983. The liner notes describe this piece as an “acoustic room resonance derived from delayed feedback.”

Track listing

Disc one: Trances
”Cave Paintings” – 23:54
”Hayagriva” – 25:13
”Sunyata (Emptiness)” – 22:50

Disc two: Drones
”Seascape” – 29:59
”Wheel of Earth” – 27:58
”Resonance” – 12:17

References

1994 compilation albums
Robert Rich (musician) albums
Extreme Records compilation albums
Relapse Records compilation albums